Air Commodore Eugene Louis Gerrard,  (14 July 1881 – 7 February 1963) was an officer in the Royal Marines and Royal Air Force.

In 1911, Gerrard was one of the first four officers chosen by the Admiralty for flying training conducted under the auspices of the Royal Aero Club – he was awarded certificate #76. Gerrard then served as a squadron commander in the newly formed Royal Flying Corps and was posted as a flight commander to the Central Flying School.  Whilst at the Central Flying School, Gerrard set two records for flying at high altitude with passengers.  On the first occasion, he flew to 10,000 feet with Major Hugh Trenchard. Later, Gerrard flew to 8,400 feet with two passengers.

Following the outbreak of the First World War, Gerrard took up command of No. 1 Squadron of the Royal Naval Air Service. One of his first acts was to attack the Düsseldorf Airship Sheds in a B.E.2a. Later in the war, Gerrard was appointed as the commander of an RNAS wing in the eastern Mediterranean where he gained the Distinguished Service Order for his leadership.

References
 Air of Authority – A History of RAF Organisation – Air Commodore E L Gerrard

|-

|-

|-

|-

|-

Royal Marines officers
Royal Air Force generals of World War I
1881 births
1963 deaths
Companions of the Order of St Michael and St George
Companions of the Distinguished Service Order